The village of Coal Valley is located in both Rock Island County and Henry County in the U.S. state of Illinois. The population was 3,743 at the 2010 census, up from 3,606 in 2000. It is mostly residential, housing families who work in or out of the greater Quad Cities Area and is considered a suburb. The students of the Rock Island County part of Coal Valley attend the Moline School District number 40, and in the Henry County portion, Orion Community Unit School District 223

Oakwood Country Club, located in Coal Valley, was host of the Hardee's Golf Classic from 1986 through 1994. The tournament was later renamed to "John Deere Classic" once sponsorship was taken over by Deere & Company. The tournament is now hosted at the TPC at Deere Run course in Silvis, Illinois.

History

The first settlers in Coal Valley were trappers and farmers who came from Wales, England, Ireland, Germany and Sweden. The pioneer settlers of the community are thought to have been William and Charles Bailey who built the first house within the present village limits. It is also believed that they operated a small mine, which could have been the first discovery of coal in the vicinity.

The Coal Valley Mining Company was formed in 1856. The men who incorporated the company were Holmes Hakes, Charles Buford, S. S. Guyer, Ben Harper and N. B. Buford. They gave the community its name. The booming years for coal mining in Coal Valley were from the 1850s to about the middle of the 1870s. Over the years other mining companies moved in. 1942 saw the end of coal mining in and around the community.

In March 1876, a vote was taken and passed to form the Village of Coal Valley. On April 22, 1876, the first Board of Trustees was made. On April 22, 1876, H. B. Sudlow was chosen president and Harvey Clark was appointed the first Constable.

In May 1892, a petition was signed by twenty-eight citizens of Coal Valley, asking that a town hall be erected. The lots needed for the building site were purchased from Gustave Krapp Sr. Mr. Johnson of Orion was contracted to erect the building. The hall was built identically to Orion's town hall. Work began in September and by Thanksgiving the building was up. In January 1893, the hall was officially accepted. The total cost was under $3,000.

In April 1900, the Village Board purchased a fire engine and hose cart for the sum of $875. In November 1900, the Village Board purchased the land and built a one-story fire station.

In 1929, the construction of Highway 150 was completed through the Village, and in 1933, it was extended as far east as Orion.

In 1939, the Coal Valley High School was built at the cost of $70,000 and that fall forty-six pupils were enrolled. The first members to graduate from the new Coal Valley High School were Ruth Schroeder, Evelyn Martin, Mary Kepple, Florence Robinson, Raymond Johnson, Harlan Raub, Robert Anderson, Sydney Bradford and Francis Creger. The Coal Valley High School was dissolved in 1952 and used as the junior high, and high school students attended the new high school in Moline.

Geography
Coal Valley is located at  (41.439788, -90.455939).

Demographics

As of the census of 2000, there were 3,606 people, 1,373 households, and 1,059 families residing in the village. The racial makeup of the village was 97.06% White, 0.69% African American, 0.03% Native American, 0.42% Asian, 0.58% from other races, and 1.22% from two or more races. Hispanic or Latino of any race were 3.00% of the population.

There were 1,373 households, out of which 33.8% had children under the age of 18 living with them, 64.6% were married couples living together, 9.0% had a female householder with no husband present, and 22.8% were non-families. 18.2% of all households were made up of individuals, and 6.6% had someone living alone who was 65 years of age or older.  The average household size was 2.63 and the average family size was 2.97.

In the village, the population was spread out, with 24.8% under the age of 18, 9.1% from 18 to 24, 29.1% from 25 to 44, 27.4% from 45 to 64, and 9.6% who were 65 years of age or older.  The median age was 38 years. For every 100 females, there were 99.3 males.  For every 100 females age 18 and over, there were 96.7 males.

The median income for a household in the village was $49,228, and the median income for a family was $56,114. Males had a median income of $40,801 versus $23,529 for females. The per capita income for the village was $20,996.  About 6.7% of families and 7.4% of the population were below the poverty line, including 10.6% of those under age 18 and 15.0% of those age 65 or over.

References

External links
Village of Coal Valley 
 Coal Valley Police Department

Old website:
The Village of Coal Valley

Villages in Henry County, Illinois
Villages in Rock Island County, Illinois
Villages in Illinois
Cities in the Quad Cities
Populated places established in 1876
1876 establishments in Illinois